Van Stadensriviermond is a coastal resort about 15 km east of the mouth of the Gamtoos River and 10 km south of Van Stadensberg west of Port Elizabeth. Afrikaans for 'Van Staden's river mouth', it takes its name from its position. The Van Stadens River and the mountain are said to have been named after Marthinus van Staden, who owned a loan-farm there about 1744.

References

Populated places in Nelson Mandela Bay